The Murray Channel is a channel of Chile located in the Commune of Cabo de Hornos, in the Antártica Chilena Province of the Magallanes y la Antártica Chilena Region. It separates Hoste Island from Navarino Island and is bounded by the Beagle Channel to the north. The salinity of the Murray Channel is approximately 31.8 parts per thousand.

Prehistory
The Yaghan peoples settled the lands along the Murray Channel approximately 10,000 years ago. There are notable archaeological sites indicating such early Yaghan settlement, such as Bahia Wulaia on Isla Navarino, where the Bahia Wulaia Dome Middens are located.

References
 César Cárdenas, Leen van Ofwegen, Américo Montie, and Dirk Schories (2008) First Records of Octocorallia (Cnidaria: Anthozoa) to the Cape Horn Biosphere Reserve, Magellan Region, Chile
 C. Michael Hogan (2008) Bahia Wulaia Dome Middens, The Megalithic Portal'', ed. A. Burnham

Line notes

External links 
 Comuna de Cabo de Hornos / Commune of Cabo de Hornos official website

Straits of Chile
Bodies of water of Magallanes Region
Landforms of Tierra del Fuego